In mathematics, the Goncharov conjecture is a conjecture introduced by  suggesting that the cohomology of certain motivic complexes coincides with pieces of K-groups.

Statement

Let F be a field. Goncharov defined the following complex called  placed in degrees :

He conjectured that i-th cohomology of this complex is isomorphic to the motivic cohomology group .

References

Conjectures
K-theory
Cohomology theories